The 2020-21 Gulf 12 Hours was the tenth edition of the Gulf 12 Hours held at Bahrain International Circuit on 9 January 2021. The race was contested with GT3-spec cars and GT4-spec cars. The event promoters were the Driving Force Events (DFE). This edition has been relocated from Abu Dhabi’s Yas Marina Circuit to Bahrain International Circuit.

Entry list

Results

Results after 6 hours
Class winners denoted in bold.

Final results
Class winners denoted in bold.

References

External links 
 

Gulf 12 Hours
Gulf 12 Hours